The Bridge in Solebury Township is an historic stone arch bridge located at Carversville in Solebury Township, Bucks County, Pennsylvania, United States.  It has two spans, each 20 feet long, and was constructed in 1854.  It is constructed of roughly squared stone.

It was listed on the National Register of Historic Places in 1988.

Gallery

References 

Road bridges on the National Register of Historic Places in Pennsylvania
Bridges completed in 1854
Bridges in Bucks County, Pennsylvania
National Register of Historic Places in Bucks County, Pennsylvania
1854 establishments in Pennsylvania
Stone arch bridges in the United States